George Humphrey may refer to:

 George Humphrey (psychologist) (1889–1966), British psychologist
 George Duke Humphrey (1897–1973), president of the Mississippi State College, 1934–1945
 George M. Humphrey (1890–1970), American lawyer, businessman and Cabinet secretary
 George M. Humphrey (Nebraska politician) (1839–1894), American politician
 George M. Humphrey (Wisconsin politician), American politician
 George Humphrey (naturalist) (1739–1826), English auctioneer and dealer